Athens 2004 is the official video game of the Games of the XXVIII Olympiad, hosted by Athens, Greece in 2004. Developed by Eurocom and published by Sony Computer Entertainment (Eidos Interactive for PC), it was released for the PlayStation 2 and Microsoft Windows.

List of events
Following is a list of events in the game. By default, all events are available for both sexes unless otherwise noted:
Track
Sprints: 100 metres, 200 metres and 400 metres
Middle distance: 800 metres and 1500 metres
Hurdles: 100 metres hurdles for women and 110 metres hurdles for men
Field
Jumping: Long jump, triple jump, high jump and pole vault
Throwing: Discus throw, javelin throw and shot put
Swimming
100 metres breaststroke, freestyle, backstroke and butterfly
Gymnastics (PS2 version only)
Artistic: Floor exercise (separate gameplay for male and female), still rings (men only) and vault
Equestrian (PS2 version only)
Show jumping (mixed gender event)
Weight lifting
+105 kg. clean and jerk (male only)
Archery
70 m individual (female only)
Shooting
Skeet shooting (male only)

Playable nations

A record 64 countries were able to be played on the game. They are:

Reception

The PlayStation 2 version of Athens 2004 received "mixed" reviews, while the PC version received "unfavorable" reviews, according to the review aggregation website Metacritic. In Japan, where the PS2 version was ported for release on 29 July 2004, Famitsu gave it a score of one seven, two sixes, and one seven for a total of 26 out of 40.

References

External links
Athens 2004 at Eurocom

2004 video games
2004 Summer Olympics
Summer Olympic video games
PlayStation 2 games
Video games set in 2004
Video games set in Greece
Windows games
Eurocom games
Sony Interactive Entertainment games
Eidos Interactive games
Multiplayer and single-player video games
Video games developed in the United Kingdom